The 2014–15 Harvard Crimson women's basketball team represents Harvard University during the 2014–15 NCAA Division I women's basketball season. The Crimson, led by thirty-third year head coach Kathy Delaney-Smith, play their home games at the Lavietes Pavilion and are members of the Ivy League.

Roster

Schedule

|-
!colspan=8 style="background:#991111; color:#FFFFFF;"| Regular season

Source:

See also
 2014–15 Harvard Crimson men's basketball team

References

Harvard
Harvard Crimson women's basketball seasons
Harvard Crimson women's basketball
Harvard Crimson women's basketball
Harvard Crimson women's basketball
Harvard Crimson women's basketball